Butlerville is an unincorporated community and census-designated place (CDP) in central Campbell Township, Jennings County, Indiana, United States. As of the 2010 census it had a population of 282.

History
The Butlerville post office was established in 1851. An early settler being a former resident of Butlerville, Ohio, caused the name to be selected. Butlerville was legally platted in 1853.

Hannah Milhous Nixon, mother of President Richard Nixon, was born near Butlerville.

The community was home to Butlerville High School, home of the Bulldogs; which graduated classes from ~1910 thru 1950.  Today, the community is serviced by Jennings County High School.

Geography

Although Butlerville is unincorporated, it has a post office, with the ZIP code of 47223.

The community is bordered to the west by Southeast Purdue Agricultural Center.

Demographics

References

External links
 Amos Butler sterilized prisoners and the handicapped at nearby mental hospital.

Census-designated places in Jennings County, Indiana
Census-designated places in Indiana